DHA-clozapine (tentative trade name Clozaprexin) is an atypical antipsychotic drug candidate that was created and originally tested by chemists at Protarga, a small pharmaceutical in Pennsylvania, and scientists at Harvard University.   

It is a prodrug of  clozapine; the fatty acid docosahexaenoic acid (DHA) was added to clozapine in order to increase penetration of the blood–brain barrier. 

Protarga was purchased by Luitpold Pharmaceuticals in 2003 and development was discontinued in 2007.

References 

Atypical antipsychotics
Chloroarenes
Dibenzodiazepines
Dopamine antagonists
Piperazines
Prodrugs
Serotonin receptor antagonists
Abandoned drugs